The .38 Short Colt, also known as .38 SC, was a heeled bullet cartridge intended for metallic cartridge conversions of the cap and ball Colt 1851 Navy Revolver from the American Civil War era.

Later, this cartridge was fitted with a   diameter inside-lubricated bullet in the 125–135 grain range.

Case
Visually, it resembles a .38 S&W but the case dimensions are slightly different. The .38 Short Colt case is the parent to the .38 Long Colt and .38 Special.

Remington is one of the few producers of this cartridge today with a 125 gr LRN bullet. Magtech produces this grain weight and Ten-x manufactures a 95 gr load, as well as blanks.

This cartridge can be safely fired in revolvers chambered for .38 Special or .357 Magnum.

References

Pistol and rifle cartridges
Colt cartridges